Warsaw is an extinct town in McIntosh County, in the U.S. state of Georgia. The GNIS classifies it as a populated place.

History
Variant names are "Darien Junction", "Old Darien Junction", and "Theo". A post office called Theo was established in 1895, and remained in operation until 1907. The most recent name of "Warsaw" was adopted in 1915. The present name may be borrowed from Warsaw, in Poland.

After the town's sawmill burned in 1934, Warsaw's population began to dwindle.

References

Geography of McIntosh County, Georgia
Ghost towns in Georgia (U.S. state)